Scorpio is the Latin word for scorpion. The name may refer to:

Astronomy and astrology
 Scorpio (astrology), a sign of the Zodiac
 Scorpius, a constellation often called Scorpio

People with the name
 Eddie Morris, a member of the hip-hop group Grandmaster Flash and the Furious Five
 D.C. Scorpio, a hip-hop recording artist
 2 Cold Scorpio, a professional wrestler
 Scorpio Sky, a professional wrestler

Arts, entertainment, and media

Fictional characters 
 Scorpio (Marvel Comics), a Marvel Comics supervillain
 Scorpio (DC Comics), DC Comics terrorist organization
 Scorpio, the heroes' fictional spacecraft in the final season of the TV series Blake's 7
 The Scorpio Killer, the antagonist in the 1971 Clint Eastwood film Dirty Harry
 Hank Scorpio (voiced by Albert Brooks), a character in the episode "You Only Move Twice" of The Simpsons
 Scorpios rex, a hybrid dinosaur introduced in the 3rd season of the Netflix show Jurassic World Camp Cretaceous

Music
 Scorpio (album), a 1977 album by Bill Anderson
 "Scorpio" (Grandmaster Flash and The Furious Five song), one of the original founding members and is a song recorded by Grandmaster Flash and The Furious Five
 "Scorpio" (instrumental), a song recorded by Dennis Coffey
 "Scorpio" (Moneybagg Yo song), a song recorded by Moneybagg Yo
 "Scorpio" (Trax song), a song recorded by Korean rock band The TRAX
 "Scorpios", a song by Adam and the Ants from Prince Charming

Other uses in arts, entertainment, and media
 Scorpio (film), a 1973 spy film starring Burt Lancaster and Alain Delon
 "Scorpio" (Flashpoint), the pilot for the TV series Flashpoint

Vehicles
 Ford Scorpio, a car
 Mahindra Scorpio, an Indian SUV
 Scorpio ROV, a class of submersible remotely operated vehicle, including the Scorpio II and Super Scorpio operated by the US and UK navies
  Mahindra Scorpio Getaway a pickup truck

Other uses
 Scorpio (weapon), an artillery weapon used in Ancient Rome
 Scorpio, the codename for version 8 of the ColdFusion application server
 Project Scorpio, the codename for the Xbox One X video game console
 Scourge, a Roman whip
 Task Force Scorpio, a United Nations biological and chemical response team
 Scorpio (genus), a genus of scorpions in the family Scorpionidae

See also
 Skorpio (DC Comics), a DC Comics supervillain
 Skorpio (magazine), an Argentine comics magazine